Ignatius  Chukuemeka Olisemeka (born 12 March 1932) is a career Nigerian diplomat who served as foreign minister of Nigeria.

He was born in Kaduna on 13 March 1932 as the son of Oba Nduka Olisemeka.
From 1976 to 1981 he was Ambassador to Madrid with concurrent accreditation to the Holy See.
From 1984 to 1987 he was Ambassador to Washington D. C. and High Commissioner to Ottawa.
From 1993 to 1998 he was Ambassador to Tel Aviv.

References

Living people
1932 births
Foreign ministers of Nigeria
Ambassadors of Nigeria to Israel
Ambassadors of Nigeria to the United States
High Commissioners of Nigeria to Canada
Ambassadors of Nigeria to Spain
Ambassadors of Nigeria to the Holy See